Bernard Combet (born 21 September 1953) is a French former swimmer. He competed in the men's 100 metre breaststroke at the 1972 Summer Olympics.

References

External links
 

1953 births
Living people
Olympic swimmers of France
Swimmers at the 1972 Summer Olympics
Place of birth missing (living people)
Mediterranean Games silver medalists for France
Mediterranean Games medalists in swimming
Swimmers at the 1975 Mediterranean Games
French male breaststroke swimmers
20th-century French people
21st-century French people